The Makati Science High School (Filipino: Mataas na Paaralang Pang-agham ng Makati; informal: MakSci) is a public secondary school located in Kalayaan Avenue, Cembo, Makati. The school implemented the K-12 system last 2016 and offers only the Science and Technology, Engineering and Mathematics (STEM) Strand for Senior High School (SHS). The current principal serving the school is Mrs. Eden Fredeluces Samadan since 2018.

History 
The school was founded as Makati West High School on June 16, 1986 in Mayapis Street, Barangay San Antonio with the help of then-mayor Jejomar Binay in order to address the need of elementary graduates of the first legislative district of Makati. In its inauguration it was only the third public secondary school in the city, coming after Makati High School (1968) and Fort Bonifacio High School (1947). The school was re-christened as the Makati Science High School in 1994 and relocated to Osias Street, Barangay Poblacion in 1997. In 2014, it was moved to its current location in Kalayaan Avenue, Barangay Cembo.

On March 31, 2019, a fire broke out in the new Makati Science building on one of the classrooms at the 6th floor.

In 2022, the Supreme Court of the Philippines ruled that Makati should stop exercising jurisdiction over Cembo, where the Makati Science High School is located, effectively placing the high school in Taguig.

Admission and Retention Program

Incoming students will take the entrance exam provided that they are a member of the graduating class of the current school year with no grades lower than 85% in Math, Science, and English and 83% on other subjects during the current school year. 70% of the admission will come from the Exam and 30% will come from the interview.

The school has a retention program, students are required to have an average of 85% on Math, Science, and English subjects and Add-on subjects and 83% on other subjects and have a general average of 85% and higher. Failure to meet these requirements can result for the student to be on probationary status or disqualification to enroll for the next school year.

The retention program is not applicable to Senior High School.

Publications

The school annually releases its publications to the students and teachers containing the highlight news and events that has happened throughout the school year. It has two organizations responsible for the making and printing of the publications:
 Ang Kadluan - The official Filipino publication of Makati Science High School.
 The MSHS Vision - The official English publication of Makati Science High School.

Curriculum
Makati Science High School follows the K-12 curriculum set by the Department of Education. In Junior High School, there are additional specialized subjects that are not taught in ordinary high schools, including additional subjects to General Math, Science, and English which are advance lessons.

Campus 
Makati Science relocated to its new campus in 2014. It is a 10-story building excluding the basement parking. The school has 10 science laboratories, 3 computer labs, 2 canteens, 2 elevators, a library, a speech lab, an Audio Visual Room, a clinic, 6 Faculty Rooms, and 30 classrooms. The 8th floor is a dormitory and the 9th and 10th floor is an auditorium. The last 3 floors are still under construction and closed to the public. It has a basketball court to its left side and a garden at the back.

The current building of the school was subject to controversy after it was involved in a graft case against former vice president Jejomar Binay and then-mayor Junjun Binay, who are father and son. The structure was said to have cost  (21.5 million), when it should have only been worth  (9.2 million).

References

External links 
 

Science high schools in Metro Manila
Educational institutions established in 1986
Schools in Makati
1986 establishments in the Philippines